The Local Alliance is a political party based in Chichester, England. The party was founded in 2019 and has successfully contested local elections to Chichester District Council and West Sussex County Council.

Election results

West Sussex County Council

Chichester District Council

References

External links
 Official website

Political parties established in 2019
Locally based political parties in England
Organisations based in West Sussex
Politics of West Sussex
Chichester
2019 establishments in England